
Gmina Baranów Sandomierski is an urban-rural gmina (administrative district) in Tarnobrzeg County, Subcarpathian Voivodeship, in south-eastern Poland.

Villages
Apart from the town of Baranów Sandomierski, Gmina Baranów Sandomierski contains the villages and settlements of Dąbrowica, Durdy, Dymitrów Duży, Dymitrów Mały, Kaczaki, Knapy, Marki, Siedleszczany, Skopanie, Ślęzaki, Suchorzów and Wola Baranowska.

Neighbouring gminas
Gmina Baranów Sandomierski is bordered by the city of Tarnobrzeg and by the gminas of Cmolas, Łoniów, Majdan Królewski, Nowa Dęba, Osiek, Padew Narodowa and Tuszów Narodowy.

References
Polish official population figures 2006

Baranow Sandomierski
Tarnobrzeg County